The CONCACAF Gold Cup is North America's major tournament in senior men's football and determines the continental champion. Until 1989, the tournament was known as CONCACAF Championship. It is currently held every two years. From 1996 to 2005, nations from other confederations have regularly joined the tournament as invitees. In earlier editions, the continental championship was held in different countries, but since the inception of the Gold Cup in 1991, the United States are constant hosts or co-hosts.

From 1973 to 1989, the tournament doubled as the confederation's World Cup qualification. CONCACAF's representative team at the FIFA Confederations Cup was decided by a play-off between the winners of the last two tournament editions in 2015 via the CONCACAF Cup, but was then discontinued along with the Confederations Cup.

Since the inaugural tournament in 1963, the Gold Cup was held 26 times and has been won by seven different nations, most often by Mexico (11 titles).

Curaçao have qualified for the continental championship six times. As the Netherlands Antilles, the team scored good results in the 1960s, including two Third Places. Since the dissolution of the Netherlands Antilles in 2010, Curaçao have qualified twice. In 2017, they lost all three group matches. In 2019 however, they reached the knockout stage after earning a 1–0 victory over Honduras and drawing 1–1 against Jamaica with a stunning injury time equalizer by Juriën Gaari. They were eliminated 0–1 by the United States in the quarter-finals.

Of the other CONCACAF members that used to be part of the Netherlands Antilles (Aruba, Bonaire and Sint Maarten), none have qualified for a Gold Cup as of 2019.

Overall record

Match overview

References

Countries at the CONCACAF Gold Cup
Gold cup